Hayati may refer to:

People
 Hayati Çitaklar (born 1986), Turkish playwright, director, novelist, actor and poet
 Hayati Hamzaoğlu (1933–2000), Turkish actor
 Hayati Yazıcı, Turkish lawyer and politician
 Mohd Hayati Othman, Malaysian politician

Places
 Bakhshi Hayati, a village in Chubar Rural District, Haviq District, Talesh County, Gilan Province, Iran
 Khan Hayati, a village in Chelevand Rural District, Lavandevil District, Astara County, Gilan Province, Iran
 Kuri Hayati, a village in Kuri Rural District, in the Central District of Jam County, Bushehr Province, Iran

Other uses
 Ayaam Hayati, a 2008 album by Moroccan singer Samira Said
 Hayati (album), 2006 album by Syrian singer Asalah Nasri
 "Hayati", a 2013 single by Bulgarian singer Andrea
 "Hayati", a 2020 single by Algerian rapper Soolking featuring German rapper Mero

See also
 Pir Hayati (disambiguation)

Turkish masculine given names